The Ghost of Kyiv is the nickname given to a mythical MiG-29 Fulcrum flying ace credited with shooting down six Russian planes over Kyiv during the Kyiv offensive on 24 February 2022. Various reports, including the Security Service of Ukraine, made similar claims. The Ghost of Kyiv has been credited as a morale booster for Ukrainians and as a narrative for Ukraine's success during the Russo-Ukrainian War. Two months after the spread, the Ukrainian Air Force acknowledged that he was a myth, and warned people not to "neglect the basic rules of information hygiene" and to "check the sources of information, before spreading it".

Background and claims 

On 24 February 2022, Russia began a large-scale invasion of Ukraine in an escalation of a pre-existing war between the two countries. During the Kyiv offensive, which began on the first day of the invasion, videos on social media began widely circulating of fighter jets in Ukraine shortly after the invasion started, including claims of a pilot who took down multiple Russian jets. The claim that a MiG-29 pilot nicknamed the "Ghost of Kyiv" who won six air fights in the skies of Kyiv appeared during the first 30 hours of the invasion. The six planes were reported as two Su-35s, two Su-25s, an Su-27, and an enemy MiG-29. If the flying ace had existed, they would have been the first recorded fighter ace of the 21st century.

The Ukrainian Ministry of Defence claimed that—would the shoot-downs be confirmed—the Ghost of Kyiv could be one of the dozens of experienced pilots of the military reserve who returned to the Armed Forces of Ukraine after Russia invaded. In a tweet, it referred to the Ghost of Kyiv as "the air avenger". However, Ukrainian commander-in-chief Valerii Zaluzhnyi said he could only confirm a total of six Russian planes downed on the first day of fighting in Ukraine, though there may have been more.

Former Ukrainian president Petro Poroshenko posted a tweet of a photograph of a fighter pilot, falsely claiming it to be the Ghost of Kyiv. The photo was later found to be an unrelated image from a Ministry of Defence post from 2019. On 27 February, the Security Service of Ukraine said in a Facebook post that the Ghost of Kyiv had shot down 10 aircraft. By March 2, official sources had confirmed neither an individual identity nor an official record for the rumored pilot. A day later, however, The Times reported that a Ukrainian military source said the pilot was real and was still alive. The Armed Forces of Ukraine posted on Facebook the purported pilot in his helmet with the visor up, with the caption "Hello, occupier, I'm coming for your soul!".

Military.com stated that the Ghost of Kyiv was "almost certainly a myth, albeit an incredibly useful one as Ukraine tries to rally its citizens to resist Russian conquest". Newsweek wrote that the Ghost of Kyiv was "very likely not real, but instead, an imaginary hero designed to bolster Ukrainians' morale in the face of the Russian invasion," adding "there is zero evidence the 'Ghost of Kyiv' exists with Ukrainian authorities not confirming their existence".

Reexaminations have characterized the Ghost of Kyiv as a part of a larger "information war" to counter the Russian invasion. Despite the Russian military owning an advantage in its use of information, Ukraine has defended the country's efforts and may have overtaken them using Russia's lack of success. Task & Purpose and The Times of Israel have described the Ghost of Kyiv as a narrative part of Ukraine's resistance.

On 30 April 2022, Ukraine's Air Force Command admitted the mythical status of the Ghost of Kyiv, writing that "The ghost of Kyiv is a superhero-legend, whose character was created by Ukrainians," and that "the #GhostOfKyiv is alive, it embodies the collective spirit of the highly qualified pilots". An anonymous Ukrainian military expert told BBC that it helped "raise morale at a time when people need simple stories", and the Air Force Command also warned people to not "neglect the basic rules of information hygiene" and to "check the sources of information, before spreading it". The statement came after multiple media outlets published stories wrongly identifying Major Stepan Tarabalka as the man behind the moniker. Tarabalka was a real pilot who died on 13 March 2022 during air combat and was posthumously awarded the title Hero of Ukraine.

In an interview on June 8, addressing the Ghost of Kyiv myth specifically, Ukrainian government advisor Liubov Tsybulska indicated the importance of avoiding the use of disinformation while acknowledging that mistakes may sometimes happen. She emphasized that the Ukrainian government was "capable of having lessons learned" and further expressed the most important thing was that the misinformation was acknowledged and removed.

Legacy 

Many sources consider the Ghost of Kyiv to be an urban legend or war propaganda, and the pilot's alleged existence has been credited as a major morale boost for the Ukrainian population to bolster optimism during the Russian invasion. The stories were shared by Ukrainians on social media. The Ghost of Kyiv has come to be treated by some as a composite character metaphorically representing the actions of the entire Ukrainian air force.

Computer-generated footage of the Ghost of Kyiv winning a dogfight was made using the 2013 video game Digital Combat Simulator and uploaded by a YouTube user. The uploader stated in the description that the footage was not real and was merely a tribute urging the Ghost of Kyiv, real or fake, to keep fighting. This video was shared by the official Twitter account of the Armed Forces of Ukraine. The video subsequently went viral on social media, with Snopes saying that the circulating video was miscaptioned. Separately, comedian Sam Hyde's face was photoshopped onto an American pilot who was killed in a 2018 jet crash in Ukraine, as part of a long-running joke to link Hyde to atrocities. Similar to the Ghost of Kyiv, on 26 February 2022, social media reports emerged of a Ukrainian ground forces soldier dubbed the "Ukrainian Reaper", who supposedly killed over twenty Russian soldiers in combat alone.

Task & Purpose argued that while it was highly unlikely there were even six air-to-air takedowns in total, given their rarity in the 21st century and Ukraine's strong missile defense, the Ghost of Kyiv was "real enough" as the spirit of the Ukrainians. Tom Demerly of The Aviationist argued that the Ghost of Kyiv is an "example of bizarre distortions ... amplified by the chaos of war".

See also 
 representing the Vietnam People's Air Force, and claimed killed by the Americans

Lone gunner of Flesquières

References

External links 

2022 hoaxes
Internet memes related to the 2022 Russian invasion of Ukraine
Propaganda in Ukraine related to the 2022 Russian invasion of Ukraine
Fictional fighter pilots
Fictional Ukrainian people
Nonexistent people used in hoaxes
Propaganda legends
Urban legends
Ukrainian folklore